Božidar "Boško" Antić (7 January 1944 – 4 December 2007) was a Yugoslav  and Serbian professional football manager and former player.

Playing career
Being drafted into the youth setup of Sarajevo from local side UNIS Vogošća at the age of thirteen, he started his senior career with the maroon-whites in 1965. A young and polyvalent team made up of home grown players such as Mirsad Fazlagić, Boško Prodanović, Vahidin Musemić and Antić would clinch the Yugoslav First League title in the 1966–67 season, and in doing so become the first championship-winning side in the club's history. Antić was one of the most prolific members of said team, finding the back of the net on 14 separate occasions during the title-winning campaign, while scoring a total of 140 goals in 276 appearances in all competitions for the club. A popular rhyme of the time was "Dva Boška na dva čoška, Musemija u sredini, za pobjedu ne brini" (English: Two Boškos in two corners, Musemić in the middle, don't worry it's a win). During his time with Sarajevo he was the team's top scorer in three seasons (65/66., 66/67. and 67/68), while being the league top scorer during the 1967–68 campaign, netting in 53 goals in 53 appearances.

Antić left Sarajevo in 1972, joining Frech Ligue 1 side Angers, where he remained for three years, going on to score 44 goals in 103 league matches for the club, before joining Caen in the summer of 1975. After two more seasons on the French riviera, he retired from professional football in 1977.

International career
Antić was a non-playing member of the Yugoslavia team that won the silver medal at the UEFA Euro 1968. He made his senior debut for them in an October 1968 FIFA World Cup qualification match against Spain, which remained his sole international appearance.

Managerial career
After one year of managing the Caen U-18 team, Antić came back to Sarajevo where he spent the next five years as a youth team manager and coordinator. In 1983, he was named manager of the Sarajevo first team with whom he clinched the Yugoslav title in the 1984–85 season, thus becoming the first person in the club's history to win titles both as a player and as a manager. During the three seasons as first team manager, he was assisted by former teammate Mirsad Fazlagić.

In 1987, Antić was named Togo national team head coach - a position he held for eighteen months, eventually moving back to Sarajevo with the desire to retire from professional managing. With the start of the Bosnian war and the Siege of Sarajevo in 1992, he had to leave for Belgrade where his wife was hospitalized with an illness, sometime before the siege commenced and completely cut Sarajevo off the outside world. Eventually, since the situations was lasting one, he stayed in Belgrade until his death. Indeed, while in Serbia he managed Radnički Niš and Sartid Smederevo. Antić would also go on to manage Chinese club Jiangsu Suning for a short while in 2001.

Death
Antić died on 4 December 2007 in Belgrade, Serbia after a long illness at the age of 63.

Honours

Player
Sarajevo 
Yugoslav First League: 1966–67

Yugoslavia
UEFA European Championship runner-up: 1968

Individual
Performance
Ligue 2 Top Goalscorer: 1975–76 (25 goals)

Manager
Sarajevo 
Yugoslav First League: 1984–85

References

External links
 
Boško Antić at Reprezentacija.rs 
In memoriam: Boško Antić, Večernje novosti, 4 December 2007 

1944 births
2007 deaths
Footballers from Sarajevo
Serbs of Bosnia and Herzegovina
Association football forwards
Yugoslav footballers
Yugoslavia international footballers
UEFA Euro 1968 players
FK Sarajevo players
Angers SCO players
Stade Malherbe Caen players
Yugoslav First League players
Ligue 1 players
Ligue 2 players
Yugoslav expatriate footballers
Expatriate footballers in France
Yugoslav expatriate sportspeople in France
Yugoslav football managers
Bosnia and Herzegovina football managers
 FK Sarajevo managers
Togo national football team managers
FK Radnički Niš managers
FK Smederevo managers
Jiangsu F.C. managers
Yugoslav First League managers
Yugoslav expatriate football managers
Expatriate football managers in Togo
Bosnia and Herzegovina expatriate football managers
Expatriate football managers in China
Bosnia and Herzegovina expatriate sportspeople in China